Plano may refer to:

Native Americans
 Plano cultures, the Late Paleo-Indian hunter-gatherer societies of the Great Plains of North America
 Plano point, the chipped stone tools of the Plano cultures

Places in the United States
 Plano, California, former name of Sanborn
 Plano, Illinois
 Plano (Amtrak station), train station in Plano, Illinois
 Plano, Indiana
 Plano, Iowa
 Plano, Missouri
 Plano, Ohio
 Plano, Texas

Education in the United States
 Plano High School (Illinois), a high school in Plano, Illinois
 Plano Senior High School, a senior high school in Plano, Texas
 Plano Independent School District, the school district serving Plano, Texas, and surrounding cities
 University of Plano, a former liberal arts college in Plano, Texas

People
 Lorenzo de Plano (born 1994), American businessman
 Óscar Plano (born 1991), Spanish footballer

Other uses
 Plano, California, fictitious home town near San Jose, of the protagonist of Donna Tartt's novel The Secret History

See also